= Purohito Ka Talab =

Lake in Udaipur

Coordinates: 24°40′08″N 73°44′57″E

Purohito Ka Talab, situated in Udaipur in the Indian state of Rajasthan, is an artificial fresh water lake. Purohito ka Talab is located at a distance of around 12 kilometres from Udaipur. The lake is surrounded by green mountains. Purohito ka Taalab is also known as ‘Mini Jaisamand’. It's situated between the Aravalli Range. In order to preserve the forest life in Purohito ka Taalab, it has been declared a no-fishing zone.

== Location ==
The lake is located 12 kilometres from Udaipur. A small settlement is located near the lake.

Due to its location near a forest, Purohito Ka Talab was named a no-fishing zone to protect the wild life around the lake.
